Asperoteuthis mangoldae, previously known as Asperoteuthis sp. A, is a chiroteuthid squid known only from the waters off the Hawaiian Islands. It differs from the closely related Asperoteuthis acanthoderma in lacking integumental tubercles and elongate fins. This species also possesses a characteristic curved groove in its funnel locking apparatus.

A. mangoldae is known from 18 specimens and was formally described in 2007. It was identified as A. mangoldae by Michael Vecchione, an American zoologist who contributed to the description of the species.

The specific name honors Swiss marine biologist Dr. Katharina Mangold-Wirz (1922–2003), who worked at the Laboratoire Arago, Université Pierre et Marie Curie in Banyuls-sur-Mer, France. Dr Mangold spent a part of her career studying cephalopods in Hawaii.

References

External links 
Tree of Life web project: Asperoteuthis mangoldae
 filmed by EVNautilus

Squid
Molluscs of Hawaii
Endemic fauna of Hawaii
Molluscs described in 2007